The 2017 Valencian Community motorcycle Grand Prix was the eighteenth and final round of the 2017 MotoGP season. It was held at the Circuit Ricardo Tormo in Valencia on 12 November 2017.

In the MotoGP class, Dani Pedrosa took the victory after overtaking Johann Zarco on the final lap, while Marc Márquez clinched his fourth premier class title and sixth overall with a third place finish after rival Andrea Dovizioso crashed out. The victory would prove to be Pedrosa's last in MotoGP, as well as his final podium finish.

In the Moto3 class, this was the final race for both the Peugeot and Mahindra MGP3O chassis packages, as the teams that used those bikes, CIP, Ángel Nieto Team, and Redox PrüstelGP all switched to KTM for 2018.

Classification

MotoGP

Moto2

Moto3

Championship standings after the race

MotoGP
Below are the standings for the top five riders and constructors after round eighteen has concluded.

Riders' Championship standings

Constructors' Championship standings

 Note: Only the top five positions are included for both sets of standings.

Moto2

Moto3

Notes

References

Valencia
Motorcycle Grand Prix
Valencian Community motorcycle Grand Prix
21st century in Valencia
Valencian Community motorcycle Grand Prix